Bank Street Arts (BSA) was a contemporary art centre in Sheffield, South Yorkshire, England. It was established in January 2008, initially as a studio complex for artists. It has grown to include eight public galleries, thirty artist studios and a café.

Based in the Cathedral Quarter, the organisation oversaw the redevelopment of the grade II listed Georgian terrace buildings previously used as lawyers offices. The organisation itself is independent and self-funded.

It has aimed to provide a base for artwork in the local area. As a result, a large proportion of exhibitors reside in the South Yorkshire region. In 2009, the centre opened to the public on a daily basis.

In February 2010, Bank Street Arts became a registered Charity in England and Wales focused on regeneration of the city through artistic means. Registration was removed in November 2018 as the charity ceased to exist.

Artistic programme 
The artistic programme comprises the BSA residency scheme and a range of exhibitions alongside the major citywide festivals, including the Sheffield Children's Festival, Galvanise festival, Grin Up North festival and Off the Shelf Festival.

References

External links

Art galleries established in 2000
Arts centres in England
Art museums and galleries in Sheffield